William R. Ewing is an American director, producer, screenwriter and president of Every Tribe Entertainment and Bearing Fruit Entertainment.

Career
Ewing began his career as an actor then joined Sony Pictures in 1986 and was named director of production services in 1987. He was promoted to Vice President in 1988 and later to Senior Vice President after Sony's acquisition of Columbia Pictures. He supervised production of over 100 films, including A League of Their Own, My Girl, Groundhog Day, In the Line of Fire, Little Women, Air Force One, Men in Black, The Patriot, Charlie's Angels, etc. He served as Senior Vice President of Production and Administration for 15 years, with his final productions including Spider-Man, Adaptation, Stuart Little 2, and Men in Black II. In 2001 he left Sony to found Every Tribe Entertainment and the non-profit Bearing Fruit Entertainment as organizations to brings the message of the Bible to life through media including films, documentaries, television commercials, radio and print advertisements, books and video.

Personal life
Bill Ewing lives in Los Angeles with his wife Susan McIver, and is the father of singer and actor Blake McIver Ewing.

Filmography
Hollywood on Fire 2009, himself
End of the Spear 2005, producer & writer
Christmas Child 2003, director
Beyond the Gates of Splendor 2002, producer
Automan  1984 TV, actor
WKRP in Cincinnati 1982 TV, actor
Meteor 1979 cast coordinator
A Man Called Sloane 1979 TV actor
Little House on the Prairie 1979 TV
The Odyssey 1979 TV actor
The End 1978 actor
The Blue Knight 1976 TV actor
Korg: 70,000 B.C. 1974 TV, actor
The Rookies 1973 TV, actor
The Deathmaster 1972, actor
The Hoax 1972, actor
Cannon 1971 TV, actor

Additional sources
When Magazine, "Conversation with Bill Ewing, President of Every Tribe Entertainment"
Phill Coke and The Change Revolution, interview with Bill Ewing
Fluctu8.com, "Daniel Britt Interviews Bill Ewing"
Emol.org, By Madelyn Ritrosky-Winslow, "Movie with a Message: Interview with Bill Ewing about "End of the Spear"
Mediawise Family, by Ted Baehr, "Faith, Flexibility, and Focus – an interview with Bill Ewing"
Barnes and Noble, The Christmas Child: A Story of Coming Home
Impact Productions on development and filming of The Christmas Child

References

External links

Every Tribe Entertainment
Bearing Fruit Entertainment at zibb.com

Film producers from California
Living people
Year of birth missing (living people)
Writers from Los Angeles
Film directors from Los Angeles